Paradise Harbour, also known as Paradise Bay, is a wide embayment behind Lemaire and Bryde Islands in Antarctica, indenting the west coast of Graham Land between Duthiers and Leniz Points. The name was first applied by whalers operating in the vicinity and was in use by 1920. Argentina's Almirante Brown Antarctic Base stands on the coast of the bay, as does Chile's González Videla Antarctic Base.

Historic site
In 1950, a shelter was erected near the Chilean Base to honour Gabriel Gonzalez Videla, the first head of state to visit the Antarctic. The shelter constitutes a representative example of pre-IGY activity in Antarctica. It has been designated a Historic Site or Monument (HSM 30), following a proposal by Chile to the Antarctic Treaty Consultative Meeting.

See also
Gerlache Strait Geology

References

External links

Bays of Graham Land
Danco Coast